Allende is a station on Line 2 of the Mexico City Metro system. It is located in the Colonia Centro district of the Cuauhtémoc municipality of Mexico City, on Tacuba street west of the main square in downtown. In 2019 the station had an average ridership of 28,873 passengers per day.

Name and pictogram
The station is named in honor of general Ignacio Allende, one of the principal instigators of the Mexican War of Independence of 1810. This is due to the fact that the station is located near the intersection of the Tacuba and Allende streets. The station's pictogram depicts the bust of Allende.

General information
The station opened on 14 September 1970 as part of the second stretch of Line 2, from Pino Suárez to Tacuba.

The station has the peculiar feature that its platforms are not directly connected underground as it is the case with most stations in the system. In order to change platforms at Allende one has to exit the station and cross the street, thus making it necessary to pay the fare again, a feature only shared with Metro Tezozómoc in Line 6. 

From 23 April to 24 June 2020, the station was temporarily closed due to the COVID-19 pandemic in Mexico.

Ridership

Nearby
Teatro de la Ciudad, theater.
House of the Legislative Assembly of the Federal District
Museo Nacional de Arte, national art museum.
Palacio de Minería, museum of the Faculty of Engineering of UNAM.

Exits
Northeast: Tacuba street, Centro
Northwest: Tacuba street, Centro
Southeast: Tacuba street and Motolinia street, Centro
Southwest: Tacuba street, Centro

Gallery

See also 
 List of Mexico City metro stations

References

External links 

Allende
Railway stations opened in 1970
1970 establishments in Mexico
Mexico City Metro stations in Cuauhtémoc, Mexico City